Pasteur is a station on Line 6 and Line 12 of the Paris Métro in the 15th arrondissement. The platforms for both lines are situated underground, although Line 6 becomes elevated as it approaches northwest end of the station. Nearby are the Pasteur Institute (research facility) and the Lycée Buffon (school).

Location
The station is located at the intersection of Rue de Vaugirard and Boulevard Pasteur. On Line 6, the station is the first one underground on line from Charles de Gaulle–Étoile, after a long viaduct starting at Passy metro station.

History

The station opened on 24 April 1906 following the extension of line 2 Sud from Passy to Place d'Italie. On 14 October 1907 line 2 Sud became part of line 5. On 12 October 1942 the section of line 5 between Étoile and Place d'Italie, including Pasteur was rerouted from line 5 to line 6 in order to separate the tracks underground, as well as was elevated in certain sections (because these sections more vulnerable to air attack during World War II).

The line 12 platforms opened on 5 November 1910 as part of the original section of the Nord-Sud Company's line A between Porte de Versailles and Notre-Dame-de-Lorette. On 27 March 1931 line A became line 12 of the Paris Métro.

The station is named after the Boulevard Pasteur, which is named after Louis Pasteur (1822–1895) renowned French microbiologist and chemist.

It was the location of the Barrière de Vaugirard, a gate built for the collection of taxation as part of the Wall of the Farmers-General; the gate was built between 1784 and 1788 and demolished during the nineteenth century.

The station was seen in the film Alice et Martin when the character of Alice (played by Juliette Binoche) looks out the window of a train as it descends underground.

Passenger services

Access
There are two entrances:
 the first, on the central median of Boulevard Pasteur, south of Rue de Vaugirard;
 the second, on the Boulevard Pasteur, north of Rue de Vaugirard.

The entrance of the North-South line is wrought iron, typical of this line, while the other entrance is in a Guimard style (1909, registered as a historical monument).

Station layout

Platforms
The main theme of this station is Health. The platforms of Line 12 present research work led by Louis Pasteur. They are arranged in the Andreu-Motte orange style, with lighting strips and tympans in this colour. The benches are of beveled white tiling, unique case, and the seats are Motte white. The tiling and the North-South ceramics are however well preserved (advertising frames and frame of the station name is of a green color, with green geometrical designs on the walls and the roof). This station, the station at Porte de Versailles (on the same line) and Porte de Clichy (on line 13) are only three stations on the network to mix these two decorative styles.

The platforms of Line 6 are decorated in the Bruno-Gaudin style (2000 metro revival) with bevelled white tiling, rounded white lighting strips, white ceramic advertising frames, beige Akiko seats and the station name on enamelled plate in Parisine font.

Bus connections
The station is served by Lines 39, 70, 89 and 95 of the RATP Bus Network and, at night, by Lines N13 and N62 of the Noctilien network.

Nearby
 Institut d'aménagement et d'urbanisme de la région d'Île-de-France
 Pasteur Institute
 Necker-Enfants Malades Hospital
 Lycée Buffon
 Musée Pasteur

Gallery

References

Paris Métro stations in the 15th arrondissement of Paris
Railway stations in France opened in 1910